United States gubernatorial elections were held in November 1965, in two states.

New Jersey 
After his re-election win, Hughes tried to do an income tax, but that bill died.  The tax would come into play after
the state Supreme Court handed down a decision concerning property taxes for schools in 1973.  Hughes would become Chief Justice in 1974, and after much battling with then-Gov. Brendan Byrne and the New Jersey Legislature concerning taxes for public education, the income tax finally made it to New Jersey.

Virginia 
The 1965 Virginia's Governor's Race was colorful in that not only a new governor emerged, (Mills E. Godwin, Jr.), who would go on to serve the term as a Democrat and later serve another term as a Republican in the 1970s, but that another opponent, A. Linwood Holton, Jr., would go on to serve a term as Virginia's first Republican Governor since Reconstruction.  Not to mention that George Lincoln Rockwell, the 'American Hitler', ran in this race.

Chart

References

 
November 1965 events in the United States